The Jekerkwartier is a neighbourhood in the old city centre of Maastricht, Limburg, Netherlands. It is named after the Jeker river that flows through the neighbourhood into the Meuse.

Impressions

Neighbourhoods of Maastricht